Herne Hill is a district in South London, England.

Herne Hill may also refer to:

Herne Hill (ward), an electoral ward of the Lambeth Borough Council
Part of the A215 road leading down south to the neighbourhood of the same name in London
Herne Hill railway station
Herne Hill, Victoria, a suburb of Geelong
Herne Hill, Western Australia, a suburb of Perth

See also
Hernhill, a village in Kent